The 1994 United States Interregional Soccer League was an outdoor season run by the United States Interregional Soccer League.

Regular season

Schedule
Each team had a 20-game schedule, with two games counting as Designated Makeup Games (DMGs).  DMGs are plugged in for any game that was cancelled during the season.

Scoring
Teams in the Northeast and Midwest have points that reflect the addition of a 1-point corner kick bonus per game.  The standings published by the USISL list only the wins, losses, goals scored, goals allowed and total points.  They do not provide the number of wins or losses that came through shootouts.  They also do not provide the number of bonus points coming from goals or corner kicks.

 Regulation win = 6 points
 Shootout win (SW) = 4 points
 Shootout loss (SL) = 2 points
 Regulation loss = 0 points
 Bonus points (BP): An additional one point per goal up to a maximum of three points per game.
 Northeast Division and Midwest Division teams received one point per corner kick each game.

Northeast Division

Atlantic Division

Southeast Division

Midwest Division

Midsouth Division

South Central Division

Southwest Division

Pacific Division

Playoffs

Northeast Division

The game remained tied through two overtime periods.  The Long Island Rough Riders advanced due to their 4-2 advantage in corner kicks.

Final

The Long Island Rough Riders advanced.

Atlantic Division

Final

The Charleston Battery advanced.

Southeast Division

Final

 With the series tied at one game each, the Expos and Magic played a mini-game to determine who would advance.

The Cocoa Expos advanced.

Midwest Division

Final

The Minnesota Thunder advanced.

Midsouth Division

Final

The Birmingham Grasshoppers advanced.

South Central Division

Final

The DFW Toros advanced.

Southwest Division

Final

 With the series tied at one game apiece, the Cobras and Valley Eagles played a minigame to determine who advanced.

The East Los Angeles Cobras advanced.

Pacific Division

Final

 With the series tied at one game apiece, Chico and North Bay played a mini-game to determine who would advance.

The Chico Rooks advanced.

Sizzlin' Nine Championship

Greensboro Group

 Greensboro Dynamo defeated Birmingham Grasshoppers 6-1
 DFW Toros defeated Birmingham Grasshoppers 4-1
 Greensboro Dynamo defeated DFW Toros 8-2

Charlotte Group

 Charleston defeated Cocoa 4-2
 Charleston defeated Chico 5-0
 Cocoa defeated Chico 6-0

Raleigh Group

 East Los Angeles Cobras defeated Minnesota Thunder 3-2 (SO)
 Long Island Rough Riders defeated East Los Angeles Cobras 8-2

Semi-finals

Final

Points leaders

Honors
 MVP: Manny Lagos
 Points leader: Chris Veselka
 Goals leader: Richard Sharpe
 Assist Leader: Wane Lobring
 Goalkeeper of the Year: Kyle Krpata
 Coach of the Year:  Tim Hankinson

External links
United Soccer Leagues (RSSSF)
The Year in American Soccer – 1994
Divisional finals

References

USISL outdoor seasons (1989–1994)
2